Kroon is a Dutch, Danish, Norwegian, and Swedish surname, from the Swedish "Kron" meaning crown. It may refer to:

 Estonian kroon, the former currency of Estonia
 Hollands Kroon, a municipality in the Netherlands

People with the surname 
 Ciro Kroon (1916–2001), Netherlands Antilles politician and Prime Minister
 Evert Kroon (1946–2018), Dutch water polo goalkeeper
 Helena Margaretha Kroon (born 1965), Dutch novelist and columnist
 Henk van der Kroon (born 1942), Dutch founder of the Federation of European Carnival Cities
 Karsten Kroon (born 1976), Dutch road bicycle racer
 Knut Kroon (1906–1975), Swedish football player
 Larry Kroon, American evangelical pastor 
 Luuk Kroon (1942–2012), Dutch naval officer and Chief of the Netherlands Defence Staff
 Marc Kroon (born 1973), American baseball pitcher
 Marco Kroon (born 1970), Dutch soldier and recipient of the Military William Order
 Niclas Kroon (born 1966), Swedish tennis player
 Piet Kroon (1945–2021), South African chess master
 Robert Kroon (1924–2007), Dutch journalist 
 Ron Kroon (1942–2001), Dutch swimmer
 Simon Kroon (born 1993), Swedish footballer

See also 
 De kroon der schande, a 1918 Dutch silent drama film directed by Maurits Binger
 Croon
 

Dutch-language surnames
Swedish-language surnames